County routes in Ulster County, New York, are mostly signed with the Manual on Uniform Traffic Control Devices-standard yellow-on-blue pentagon route marker, however, several routes are still marked with very faded, sometimes illegible blue diamond shaped markers with white or yellow lettering, and the route number inside of an outline of the county, similar to those old markers in Orange County. All roads maintained by Ulster County are assigned a county highway (CH) number; this number is posted on small green signs placed below the route marker but is otherwise unsigned. Each county route comprises one or more county highways; however, not all county highways are part of a signed county route.

County routes

County highways
Every county-maintained road is assigned an unsigned county highway number for inventory purposes. The majority of county highways are part of signed county routes; however, some are not posted with any designation. Those highways or parts of highways that are not part of any county routes are listed below.

See also

County routes in New York

References

External links